Christopher Ettridge (born 21 February 1948) is an English actor and director born in Isleworth, London.

Career 
Ettridge is best known for his role as dim but good-natured police officer Reg Deadman in the time-travelling comedy series Goodnight Sweetheart, which aired between 1993 and 1999 and returned for a special edition in 2016. He has also had roles in EastEnders, The Bill, Harry Enfield and Chums, Kevin and Perry Go Large, Julius Caesar and Hitler: The Rise of Evil. He has been directing as well as acting in recent years. He directed a production of Romeo and Juliet for ReACTion Theatre in Eastbourne.

Filmography

Film

Television

References

External links

1948 births
Living people
English male television actors
People from Isleworth